The PowerBook 1400 is a notebook computer that was designed and sold by Apple Computer, Inc. (now Apple Inc.) from 1996 to 1998 as part of their PowerBook series of Macintosh computers. Introduced in October 1996 at a starting price of $2,499, it was the first new PowerBook after the controversial PowerBook 5300. After the introduction of the more powerful PowerBook 3400c in February 1997, the 1400 took on the role of Apple's entry level notebook and remained there until its discontinuation in May 1998. Its successor, the PowerBook G3 Series (i.e. - "Wallstreet"/"Mainstreet"), would ultimately go on to replace and consolidate not only the 1400, but the 2400c and 3400c as well. 

Throughout its 18 months on the market, the PowerBook 1400 was available in a number of different configurations. It was originally released with a 117 MHz PowerPC 603e processor; a 133 MHz processor was added in July 1997, and the line topped out with a 166 MHz processor the following December. Each version was available as either a "c" or a "cs" model, differentiated largely by type of LCD technology used. While both models came with 11.3" color displays with 800 × 600 resolution, the pricier 1400c came equipped with an active matrix display and the 1400cs came with a less expensive passive matrix, dual-scan display. 

The optional 6× CD-ROM is implemented using a sleep-swappable module system similar to the one pioneered by the PowerBook 5300; other modules include a Zip drive and the standard 1.4 MB floppy (an 8× CD-ROM would eventually become standard on the 133 MHz model). A pioneering feature of the 1400 is the "BookCover" laptop skin which allows owners the opportunity to give their PowerBook a customized look. Every 1400 shipped with a gray cover, a clear cover, and six inserts; a ClarisWorks template was also included as an "extra" on the system restore CD, from which users could design their own BookCover. The 1400 was easily upgradeable. System memory modules can be "piggy-backed" onto each other (another feature unique to the 1400), allowing the use of additional RAM. The CPU is located on a removable daughter card, which can be replaced with one containing a faster processor, including a number of commercially available cards with PowerPC G3 processors from vendors such as Sonnet Technologies, NewerTech, and Vimage. Aside from its two PC Card slots, the 1400 also included an internal expansion slot. Although few applications were ever developed to utilize it, Apple did release their own branded video card which included an increased amount of VRAM and an external video port. Other devices included a third-party video card, as well as a relatively rare Ethernet networking card.

There are several well-known issues concerning the PowerBook 1400. Like all other PowerBooks prior to the PowerBook G4, the drive controller used in the 1400 is incompatible with ATA-6 hard drives. Compatibility issues could also arise with hard drives larger than 8.2 GB, resolvable by partitioning the boot drive to less than 8.2 GB or by using Mac OS 8.6 or later. Additionally, unlike all Apple notebooks to come after it, the 1400 would not boot from a CD by holding down the  key while starting the machine; the only workarounds for this were selecting the CD in the Startup Disk control panel before rebooting, or pressing the  keys.

According to Low End Mac, the 117 MHz model is a "compromised Mac" due to the lack of a level 2 cache.

Specifications

Timeline

References

External links 
 Apple's datasheets: 1400cs/117, 1400c/117, 1400cs/133, 1400c/133, 1400c/166, 1400cs/166
 Apple-history.com: 1400 series specs
 Lowendmac.com: 1400 series specs

1400c
PowerPC Macintosh computers
Computer-related introductions in 1996